Sells may refer to:

People
 Cato Sells (1859–1948), American politician
 Charles Harvey Sells (1889–1978), American politician
 Chris Sells (born 1963), American politician
 Dan Gillespie Sells (born 1978), British singer-songwriter
 Dave Sells (born 1946), American baseball player
 David Sells Hurwood (1924–2005), British doctor
 Elijah Sells (1814–1897), American military officer, politician and businessman
 Elijah Watt Sells (1858-1924), American accountant
 Hugh Sells (1922–1978), English cricket player and Royal Air Force officer
 Katherine Gillespie Sells, British campaigner
 Kieran Sells
 Michael Sells (born 1949), American historian and scholar of religion
 Mike Sells (born 1945), American politician
 Sam R. Sells (1871–1935), American politician
 Tommy Lynn Sells (1964–2014), American serial killer
 William Sells (1881–1966), British navy officer

Places
 Sells, Arizona, United States
 Sells Park, Ohio, United States

Other
 Sells Brothers Circus
 Sells Engineering, from United States v. Sells Engineering, Inc.
 Sells Floto Circus
 Sells Ltd, advertising agency